Hourihan is a surname. Notable people with the surname include:

Chip Hourihan, American film producer and director
Marie Hourihan (born 1988), Irish footballer
Meg Hourihan, American blogger and writer

See also
Hourihan Glacier, a glacier of Antarctica